Svenska Cupen 2004 was the forty-ninth season of the main Swedish football Cup. The competition started on 28 March 2004 and concluded on 6 November 2004 with the Final, held at Råsunda Stadium, Solna Municipality in Stockholms län. Djurgårdens IF won the final 3–1 against IFK Göteborg.

First round
There were 34 matches played between 28 March and 12 April 2004. There were 68 teams in the first round from Division 1, Division 2 and Division 3, but also including a few teams from Division 4 and Division 5.

!colspan="3"|28 March 2004

|-
!colspan="3"|12 April 2004

|}

Second round
In this round the 34 winning teams from the previous round were joined by 30 teams from Allsvenskan and Superettan.  The 32 matches were played between 27 April and 6 May 2004.

!colspan="3"|27 April 2004

|-
!colspan="3"|28 April 2004

|-
!colspan="3"|29 April 2004

|-
!colspan="3"|4 May 2004

|-
!colspan="3"|5 May 2004

|-
!colspan="3"|6 May 2004

|}

Third round
The 16 matches in this round were played between 19 May and 23 June 2004.

!colspan="3"|19 May 2004

|-
!colspan="3"|20 May 2004

|-
!colspan="3"|21 May 2004

|-
!colspan="3"|25 May 2004

|-
!colspan="3"|27 May 2004

|-
!colspan="3"|15 June 2004

|-
!colspan="3"|23 June 2004

|}

Fourth round
The 8 matches in this round were played between 17 June and 6 July 2004.

!colspan="3"|17 June 2004

|-
!colspan="3"|23 June 2004

|-
!colspan="3"|29 June 2004

|-
!colspan="3"|2 July 2004

|-
!colspan="3"|6 July 2004

|}

Quarter-finals
The 4 matches in this round were played between 29 July and 14 October 2004.

!colspan="3"|29 July 2004

|-
!colspan="3"|5 August 2004

|-
!colspan="3"|14 October 2004

|}

Semi-finals
The semi-finals were played on 20 October and 21 October 2004.

!colspan="3"|20 October 2004

|-
!colspan="3"|21 October 2004

|}

Final
The final was played on 6 November 2004 at the Råsunda Stadium.

Footnotes

External links 
  Svenska Cupen 2004 - Svenskfotboll.se - Official Website
  Svenska Cupen 2004 – everysport.com
  Sweden Cup 2004 - rsssf.com

2004
Cupen
2004 domestic association football cups